William Burleigh (October 24, 1785 – July 2, 1827) was a United States representative from Maine.  He was born in Northwood, New Hampshire, on October 24, 1785. He moved with his parents to Gilmanton, New Hampshire, in 1788 where he attended the common schools and taught for several years.  He then studied law, was admitted to the bar in 1815 and commenced practice in South Berwick, Maine.

He was  elected as an Adams-Clay Democratic-Republican to the Eighteenth United States Congress and as an Adams candidate to the Nineteenth, and Twentieth Congresses, and served in the U.S. Congress from March 4, 1823, until his death in South Berwick on July 2, 1827. He served as chairman of Committee on Expenditures in the Department of the Treasury for the Nineteenth Congress. His interment was in Portland Street Cemetery. His son was the later Maine state legislator and U.S. Congressional Representative, John Holmes Burleigh.

See also
List of United States Congress members who died in office (1790–1899)

References

1785 births
1827 deaths
People from Northwood, New Hampshire
Maine Democratic-Republicans
People from Gilmanton, New Hampshire
People from South Berwick, Maine
Democratic-Republican Party members of the United States House of Representatives
National Republican Party members of the United States House of Representatives from Maine
19th-century American politicians